Studime Filologjike ("Philological Studies") is a scientific magazine on Albanian language and literature, published by the Centre of Albanological Studies. It publishes linguistics studies, literary historical studies, old texts, resumes of scientific work on literature criticism and linguistics, etc.

History
The magazine started as Buletini i Institutit të Studimeve (Bulletin of the Institute of Studies), published by the Albanian Institute of History established in 1946, representing the first scientific institute in post World War II Albania. It had separate sections for linguistics, literary studies, and history. After the first issue with this name, it promptly changed to Buletin i Institutit të Shkencave (Bulletin of the Institute of Sciences), published by the Albanian Institute of Science (1948-1957) which had replaced the Institute of Studies. The magazine preserved it previous structure. In 1952, it split in two separate publications: Buletini për Shkencat Natyrore (Bulletin for the Natural Sciences), and Bulletini për Shkencat Shoqërore (Bulletin for Social Studies). The later one focused on linguistics, history, archaeology, ethnography, etc. Articles started being accompanied by a resume in French.

In 1955, the corresponding sections of social studies merged into the Albanian Institute of History and Linguistics, which affiliated with the University of Tirana during 1957-1972. During 1957-1964, the magazine came out as Buletin i Universitetit të Tiranës - seria shkencat shoqërore (Bulletin of the University of Tirana - series on social studies). After 1964, the Institute of History and Linguistics started publishing Studime Historike, and the other magazine Studime filologjike (Philological studies), both quarterly. The articles were followed by a resume in English or French.

With the establishment of the Albanian Academy of Sciences in 1972, the Institute of History and Linguistics split into the Instituti i Historisë (Institute of History) and Instituti i Gjuhës dhe Letërsisë (Institute of Linguistics and Literature) which served as the main institutions of albanology, both affiliated with the Academy of Sciences. In 2008, the Institute was disaffiliated with the Albanian Academy of Sciences, joining the Centre of Albanological Studies.

Notable contributors
 Androkli Kostallari
 Dhimitër Shuteriqi
 Eqerem Çabej
 Koço Bihiku
 Mahir Domi 
 Spiro Floqi 
 Shaban Demiraj
 Zihni Sako
 Gjovalin Shkurtaj
 Jorgo Bulo

See also
Gjuha Jonë
Kultura Popullore
List of magazines in Albania

References

1964 establishments in Albania
Literary magazines published in Albania
Albanian-language magazines
French-language magazines
English-language magazines
Linguistics journals
Magazines established in 1964
Mass media in Tirana
Albanian studies